Palangari may refer to:
 Palangari-ye Kohneh
 Palangari-ye Now